Oasys Mobile is a mobile game developer and publisher. Oasys develops top-ranked franchise games and applications based on brands such as Mattel, Sid Meier's Civilization IV, Railroad Tycoon, Pirates!, Phil Hellmuth, AROD and Hooters Calendar. Oasys also distributes content applications such as Mobile Graffiti, The Wall Street Journal and College & Greek Logos.

Formerly Summus Inc., the company changed its name to Oasys Mobile, Inc. in 2006. The company filed Chapter 11, but emerged from reorganization in October 2007. In mid 2008, Oasys Mobile and 2K Games announced a joining to release Sid Meier's Civilization IV: War of Two Cities, Railroad Tycoon, and Pirates! for the mobile market.

Mobile games and applications
{|
|- valign="top"
|
UNO
UNO Free Fall
UNO Challenge
KerPlunk!
Rock'em Sock'em Robots Mobile
Toss Across
Phil Hellmuth Texas Hold'em
Crazy 8's
Secrets of Hold'em
Merlin's Legacy
AROD MVP Baseball Challenge
Sid Meier's Civilization IV: War of Two Cities
Sid Meier's Railroad Tycoon Mobile
Sid Meier's Pirates! Mobile
|
Kentucky Derby 131
Nineball
Karpov X 3D Chess
College & Greek Logos
AOL You've Got Pictures
Fujifilm Get the Picture
Fujifilm Mobile Postcards
Hooters Calendar
Hooters Calendar Girl Tubin'''Mobile GraffitiThe Wall Street Journal Mobile|}

Products in developmentPBR: Pro Bull RidersPBR: All AccessSid Meier's Civilization IV: Defenders of the GatesUNO 2009College Fan ZoneTricky TracksVegas Casino CrazeSpawn of the DeadPlayground All-Stars Kickball''

References

External links
 Official Oasys Mobile website

Video game companies of the United States
Video game development companies
Video game publishers